Josep Alsina Calvés (born in Ripoll, 1954), is an activist for Spanish Nationalism. Former president of far-right organisation Somatemps and director of the magazine Nihil Obstat. 

He has graduated in Biology at University of Barcelona, did a Master's degree in History of Sciences and obtained a PhD in Philosophy at Autonomous University of Barcelona. He has worked as a secondary school teacher of Natural Sciences.  Other intellectual work involves publications related to Natural History, biotechnology, philosophy and politics.

In 2015 Josep Alsina participated in a debate at Catalunya Ràdio with Jordi Borràs. In the debate Josep Alsina ideology and activism are discussed as well as Borràs investigation tasks. Alsina claimed that Borràs does tabloid journalism, while Borràs showed photographs of Alsina participating in events with people aligned with the far-right. Alsina's political past was also explained, talking about his membership to different far-right political parties. Nihil Obstat Holocaust denial was also discussed. Alsina defends that the magazine recognises it existed, but that it has been mystified because it has not been a unique event. Alsina stated that in history have existed many genocides. He also said that Hitler had the intention of creating a Jew State in Madagascar, that nazism did not think at first to commit extermination, but total migration (Madagascar Plan), extermination was not a must. During the debate Alsina denied that Juan Antonio Llopart, administrator of the publisher of Nihil Obstat, had been guilty of making Holocaust apology. Alsina alleged that after Llopart's condemn to two and half years by the Barcelona Court, he was absolved by the Supreme court of Spain. However, the supreme court alleged that the diffusion of ideas by Nihil Obstat justifying the Holocaust is only punishable if the text encouraged to commit them.

In 2016 he received the award Ramiro de Maeztu.

In May 2018 he received the award Pascual Tamburri Bariain to the best short essay, given by the publication Revista Razón Española and Asociación Cultural Ruta Norte.

Politics 
At the age of 17 he entered the neo-Nazi NSSP, the National Socialist Spanish Party (Partido Español Nacional Socialista in Spanish, PENS). Later on he left for New Force (Fuerza Nueva in Spanish). After New Force he entered the MSR and SyL. Around 2011 - 2013 he joined Somatemps. At the same time he contributed to the foundation Catalan Civil Society but left it shortly after. As part of his focus on nationalism he directs the far-right publication Nihil Obstat.

His political claims revolve around the hispanity of Catalonia. He considers himself as hispanist, not constitutionalist. He describes the concept of hispanist as the person who believes in a Spain formed by a single political entity, which opposes the multiple nationalities and political entities of Spain developed through the centuries in the Iberian Peninsula:

He also defends the theory of indoctrination into Catalan nationalism through the Catalan education system ("adoctrinamiento" in Castilian Spanish), theory supported by right-wing parties and associations of Spain. However, social studies do not find causality between children national identification and educational system.

References 

1954 births
Living people
People from Catalonia